is a private university in Japan. Its campus is located in Shinzaike, Hiraoka-cho, Kakogawa, Hyōgo Prefecture.

History 
Mutsumi Gakuen
 1921: Taishi Sunday School was started in memory of the 1300th anniversary of Shotoku Taishi's death.
 1923: Suma Taishi Hall was opened in Suma-ku, Kobe, to which the Training Course of Sewing (a girls' school) was attached.
 1937: Suma Taishi Hall Foundation was incorporated. The foundation established Suma Mutsumi Girls' Vocational School (Sumanoura Girls' High School today).
 1951: The school foundation was renamed Mutsumi Gakuen.
 1955: The school foundation established Mutsumi Gakuen Women's Junior College.
 1966: The junior college was renamed Hyogo Women's Junior College, moving from Suma-ku, Kobe to Kakogawa.
Hyogo University
 1995: Mutsumi Gakuen established Hyogo University.
with one faculty: Faculty of Economics and Information Science
 1998: The junior college was reorganized into the Junior College Department of Hyogo University.
 1999: Graduate School of Economics and Information Science was established.
 2001: The Faculty of Health Science was added.
with Departments of Nutrition Management and Health System Management
 2006: The Department of Nursing was added.

Faculties (Undergraduate schools) 

Faculty of Economics and Information Science
Faculty of Health Science
Department of Nutrition Management
Department of Health System Management
Department of Nursing
Faculty of Welfare Society

Graduate schools 
Graduate School of Economics and Information Science (Master's courses only)

External links 
Official Website (in Japanese)

Private universities and colleges in Japan
Universities and colleges in Hyōgo Prefecture